Martín Alejandro Fernández Figueira (born 8 May 2001) is a Uruguayan professional footballer who plays as a midfielder for Boston River, on loan from Liverpool Montevideo.

Club career
A youth academy graduate of Liverpool Montevideo, Fernández made his professional debut on 4 May 2019 in a 4–0 league win against Boston River.

International career
Fernández is a current Uruguayan youth international.

Career statistics

References

External links
 

2001 births
Living people
Footballers from Montevideo
Association football midfielders
Uruguayan footballers
Uruguayan Primera División players
Liverpool F.C. (Montevideo) players